Matia Chowdhury (born 30 June 1942) is a Bangladeshi politician serving as the incumbent Deputy Leader of the House, and the incumbent Member of Parliament from Sherpur-2. She was the Minister of Agriculture under the first, second and third premiership of Sheikh Hasina, from 1996 to 2001 and then again on 2009 to 2019 during the previous tenures of Bangladesh Awami League in power. She is known as a veteran politician from the Awami League, and currently a presidium member of the party.

Early life and education 
Chowdhury was born on 30 June 1942 at Nazirpur of Pirojpur District. Her father, Mohiuddin Ahmed Chowdhury, was a police officer. She passed HSC from Dhaka Eden College. She later graduated from University of Dhaka.

Political career
Chowdhury started her political career from her student life. She actively participated in the movement against the Ayub regime and the movement against the Education Commission of 1962. She was elected the Vice-President of Dhaka Eden Girls College Students’ Union in 1963 and the General Secretary of Dhaka University Central Students' Union (DUCSU) in 1964–65. Chowdhury is well known in South Asia for her fiery speeches and her adamant attitude, qualities that have earned her the nickname of Ogni Konna or Girl of Fire. Although she started her political career with the left-wing National Awami Party, she is now one of the most senior leaders of the Awami League. She was the president of the then East Pakistan Students’ Union in 1965–66. Between 1967 and 1969 time and again she was organizing anti Ayub movement and was detained in jail for about 2 years. She was released from jail during the mass upsurge of 1969.

Personal life 
Chowdhury was married to Bazlur Rahman, editor of The Sangbad, one of the oldest Bengali-language dailies still in circulation, who died on 26 February 2008.

References

Living people
1942 births
University of Dhaka alumni
Eden Mohila College alumni
Awami League politicians
Women government ministers of Bangladesh
Women members of the Jatiya Sangsad
20th-century Bangladeshi women politicians
21st-century Bangladeshi women politicians
5th Jatiya Sangsad members
7th Jatiya Sangsad members
9th Jatiya Sangsad members
10th Jatiya Sangsad members
11th Jatiya Sangsad members
Agriculture ministers of Bangladesh
Bangladesh Krishak Sramik Awami League central committee members